Mike Dilger (born 7 November 1966) is an English ecologist, ornithologist, television presenter, and the wildlife reporter on the BBC television programme The One Show. He attended the University of Nottingham and UCNW Bangor in north Wales.

He has lived in Bristol for 10 years since returning from an extensive period working in Vietnam, Tanzania and Ecuador as a field biologist.

Career
.

Television
 Presenter of over 250 items for The One Show on BBC One from spring 2007 to present
 Reporter for Inside Out on BBC One for various regions from autumn 2004 to present
 Presenter on Nature's Top 40 on BBC Two in December 2008
 Presenter on Wild Gardens for ITV in July 2008
 Presenter on Nature's Calendar on BBC Two in Autumn 2006
 Presenter on CBeebies Autumnwatch in Autumn 2006 and CBeebies Springwatch in spring 2007
 Presenter on the Nature of Britain on BBC One West in autumn 2007
 Presenter for Hands on Nature on BBC Two in November 2005
 Reporter on Springwatch with Bill Oddie 2005 on BBC Two from 30 May to 16 June 2005
 On screen contributor for British Isles: A Living History on BBC One from October to November 2004
 On screen Wildlife Expert for The Terry & Gaby Show on Channel 5 in 2004
 On screen Contributor for Britain Goes Wild in May & June 2004
 Presenter for Wildlife Uncovered: UK on Channel 5 in April 2002, June 2002 & March 2003
 Presenter for The Natural History of Christmas on Channel 5 in December 2001 & repeated 2003
 Presenter for Britain's Wild Invaders on Channel 5 in August 2000 & repeated December 2003

Radio
 Contributor on a wide range of wildlife series on BBC Radio 4 from 2006 to present
 Presenter on Extreme Britain on BBC Radio 4 from February to March 2006
 Presenter on Wild Underground on BBC Radio 4 in December 2003

Books
 My Garden And Other Animals Collins, 2012. 
 Nature's Top 40: Britain's Best Wildlife. Collins, 2008. 
 Nature's Babies. Collins, 2008.

External links
 
 Official website

References

1966 births
Living people
English ecologists
English television presenters
Alumni of Bangor University
Alumni of the University of Nottingham
People from Stafford
Television personalities from Bristol